Kukura may be,

Juraj Kukura (born 1947), Slovak actor
 Philipp Kukura (born 1978), Slovak physical chemist 
Kukurá language, a linguistic hoax